The 1941 Florida A&M Rattlers football team was an American football team that represented Florida A&M College as a member of the Southern Intercollegiate Athletic Conference (SIAC) during the 1941 college football season. In their sixth season under head coach William M. Bell, the Rattlers compiled an 8–1 record, shut out six of nine opponents, and defeated  in the Orange Blossom Classic. The Rattlers played their home games at Sampson-Bragg Field in Tallahassee, Florida.

Schedule

References

Florida AandM
Florida A&M Rattlers football seasons
Florida AandM Rattlers football